USS Kenneth L. McNeal (SP-333) was a minesweeper that served in the United States Navy from 1917 to 1919.
 
Kenneth L. McNeal was built as a commercial fishing boat of the same name in 1913 by M. M. Davis at Solomon's Island, Maryland. On 31 May 1917, the U.S. Navy purchased her from her owners, the McNeal Dodson Company, Inc., of Reedville, Virginia, for naval use during World War I. She was delivered to the Navy on 14 June 1917 at Norfolk, Virginia, and was commissioned there as USS Kenneth L. McNeal (SP-333) on 10 August 1917.

After fitting out as a minesweeper, Kenneth L. McNeal departed Norfolk on 17 August 1917 bound for Boston, Massachusetts, then left Boston on 26 August 1917 bound for Brest, France. She arrived at Brest on 9 September 1917 and began  minesweeping patrols and coastal escort duty along the Brittany coast from Vannes to Saint-Brieuc. She continued these operations for the rest of World War I and into early 1919.

Kenneth L. McNeal was damaged while operating out of Brest in February 1919. The U.S. Navy offered her for sale on 11 May 1919 and decommissioned her at Brest on 8 September 1919. She was sold to Union d'Entreprisen Marocaine of Casablanca, French Morocco.

References

NavSource Online: Section Patrol Craft Photo Archive: Kenneth L. McNeal (SP 333)

Minesweepers of the United States Navy
World War I minesweepers of the United States
Ships built in Solomons, Maryland
1913 ships